The Helsen 20 is an American trailerable sailboat that was designed by Johannes "Jopie" Helsen as a cruiser and first built in 1974.

Production
The design was built by Helsen Yachts in Saint Petersburg, Florida, United States, starting in 1974, but it is now out of production.

Design
Designed as a more compact version of the Helsen 22, the Helsen 20 is a recreational keelboat, built predominantly of fiberglass, with wood trim. It has a masthead sloop rig with aluminum spars, a raked stem, a plumb transom, a transom-hung rudder controlled by a tiller and a retractable swing keel. It displaces  and carries  of lead ballast.

The design has sleeping accommodation for four people, with a double "V"-berth in the bow cabin and two berths in the main cabin. The head is located in the bow cabin between the "V"-berths.

See also
List of sailing boat types

References

External links
Photo of a Helsen 20

Keelboats
1970s sailboat type designs
Sailing yachts
Trailer sailers
Sailboat type designs by Johannes "Jopie" Helsen
Sailboat types built by Universal Marine